is a story collection by Japanese writer Koji Suzuki and first published on February 5, 1999 in Japan. It is the fourth installment of Suzuki's Ring series.

Plot
The book consists of three short stories occurring each in a different timeframe, and are all related to the Ring universe:

Coffin in the Sky (空に浮かぶ棺, Sora ni Ukabu Hitsugi) 
In November 1990 during the events of Spiral, Mai Takano finds herself waking up at the bottom of an exhaust shaft of a building near Tokyo Bay. The only way out of the shaft is by climbing a cloth tied to a beam nearby, but her ankle is broken and the shaft is too small for an adult to reasonably move about. To her surprise, Mai also finds out that she is pregnant, despite never having a sexual encounter before. She experiences bouts of leaving and entering unconsciousness and tries to recall her life and the events that made her there. As a former aide of Ryuji Takayama, who died of the ring virus, she was ordered by his publisher to search for some missing work papers in his childhood home. Rather than finding them, Mai was entranced by Ryuji's copy of the cursed video and decided to take it home and watch it. Upon watching, she felt movement in her belly and underwent morning sickness. Mai realizes that she herself is responsible for her predicament; her baby caused her to go into a trance and ordered her to leave her home while going commando and carrying a cloth and a sack of towel. She secretly went to the shaft and tied cloth to its surroundings, intending to climb down, but she slipped and fell, breaking her ankle.

Mai's pregnancy is soon due and she gives birth to a baby whom she realizes is Sadako Yamamura, reborn. The baby Sadako cuts her umbilical cord from the placenta, wipes herself with the towel, and finally leaves the shaft with the cord using the cloth, but not before flashing a grin at Mai and throwing the cloth, tied, back to the shaft, leaving Mai to die.

Lemon Heart (レモンハート) 
Hiroshi Toyama calls journalist Kenzo Yoshino to tell him more about Sadako Yamamura. Yoshino has just attended Kazuyuki Asakawa's funeral and also receives news of Mai Takano's death in an exhaust shaft. Toyama is nearing his fifties, a twice-married man with children and a stable job, but he longs to meet Sadako, the only woman he truly loves. He recounts to Yoshino events that transpired 21 years earlier, when Toyama was merely a young sound director trainee of Theater Group Soaring. Toyama had a secret affair with Sadako, who begged him not to reveal it to outsiders as she still wanted to achieve success as a stage actress without controversy. Sadako pointed out the existence of an altar with a wrinkled umbilical cord behind Toyama's work room, which unsettled him. Toyama was further unsettled when Sadako groped director Yusaku Shigemori, which she stated was just a way to keep him away from her. She later apologized by having sex with Toyama in his work room. Toyama felt as if her voice penetrated his head directly.

Upon the end of his story, Yoshino reluctantly tells Toyama that Sadako is probably dead. Yoshino then relays the truth of what happened at the end of the play that he heard from another surviving ex-member. During the closing party, Toyama was out of the theater complex to drink. Another trainee named Okubo, who had a crush on Sadako, was rummaging through the sound room when he found a tape recording Sadako and Toyama's intercourse. Jealous, he broadcast it to the green room, where several people, including Shigemori heard it. The next day, Shigemori mysteriously died after supposedly visiting Sadako's apartment. The day was when Sadako disappeared from Toyama's life for good. Yoshino says that all of the people who heard the recording, including Okubo, died in the previous year one after another.

Toyama becomes paranoid of his mortality, as while he did not hear the recording, he was present in it. He also knew that Sadako used her thoughtography to record the sex tape. A week after the meeting with Yoshino, Toyama feels aches in his heart and collapses at a street. He sees a woman in green dress following him while carrying an umbilical cord. Upon closer look, Toyama realizes that the woman is Sadako reborn, and the cord is the one she cut from Mai's womb. Instead of becoming frightened, Toyama welcomes her and dies in Sadako's arms.

Happy Birthday (ハッピー・バースデイ)
Following the events of Loop, Reiko Sugiura is called to meet with Toru Amano, a scientist of the LOOP project. She is shown events in the project: the deaths of Mai Takano and Hiroshi Toyama, both connected by Sadako Yamamura. Amano reveals to Reiko about the LOOP project, a simulated but alive universe mirroring the real world, how it was frozen 20 years ago just when the project was consumed by Sadako and her ring virus/Metastatic Human Cancer Virus (MHCV), and how Kaoru Futami, a reincarnation of Ryuji Takayama and Reiko's lover, had found a cure to neutralize the virus. Amano says that Kaoru entered the LOOP to find the cure and therefore is dead in the real world. However, he made a promise to Amano and Prof. Eliot to allow him meet with Reiko face-to-face. Reiko dons virtual reality goggles and gloves and is thrust into the LOOP, where she meets Kaoru attempting to assure her that everything is alright.

Months go by and Reiko is awaiting for the due of her son by Kaoru. Having lost her husband, her son, Ryoji, and Kaoru, loneliness increasingly overwhelms her, although she is keeping in touch with Kaoru's father, Hideyuki, who has been cured of the MHC. She periodically checks the LOOP to see Kaoru, whom she learns has rapidly aged from a 20-year-old to a 37-year-old, and finally to an old man in his sixties. Reiko is told that other than the neutralizer, Kaoru also found a virus that manages to make the Sadako clones of LOOP rapidly age and die; however, because Kaoru is also a clone, he is affected by the virus as well. Eventually, Reiko has to see Kaoru die at a street while dreaming of Reiko.

When her time is due, Reiko gives birth to a healthy boy. She sees Kaoru's spirit appear in her room. He cradles their son and says "happy birthday".

Adaptations 
No adaptations have adapted all three stories at once. The 2000 film Ring 0: Birthday and the audio drama adapt the short story Lemonheart, while the 1999 manga adapts Floating Coffin and Lemonheart, leaving out Happy Birthday, instead replacing it with a new story called Sadako.

Films
Ring 0: Birthday (2000)

Audio Drama
Birthday (2000)

Manga
Birthday (1999)

Book information 
Vertical Inc. published the English translation of Birthday in December 2006.

Sources and external links 
The Ring AREA – contains the cursed videos of the Ring cycle and their scene-by-scene analyses, as well as much other useful information.
 Vertical Inc. – publisher of English translations of the Ring novels.

1999 short story collections
The Ring (franchise)
Short story collections by Koji Suzuki
Vertical (publisher) titles